Bhavnagar Amreli Forest is a reserved area for conservation of Asiatic lions. The new location is east side of Gir National Park in Amreli district of Gujarat. After inclusion of New Jesal sanctuary the area of this forest will go to 1600 km2 which is bigger than Gir sanctuary. The Gujarat state government insisted on shifting the lions to this forest claiming that lions were pride of Gujarat. However the central government is pressuring Gujarat state government to shift some lions in Kuno Wildlife Sanctuary. There are almost 110 lions outside the protected area in Gir forest. A pride of about 20 lions will be introduced in three different area in this forest. A large number of lions have been wiped out of Tanzania's Serengeti National Park. To prevent this from happing at Gir forest, Gujarat state government has proposed this habitat. 

Distribution of Asiatic lions according to 2010 census: 

According to above table 141 lions live in Bhavnagar and Amreli districts.

References

External links
Major fire in lion’s abode in Amreli
Lion sanctuary to come up at Jesar
Nine leopards killed in 5 years
New 109 sq km conservation reserve earmarked for lions in Ahmedabad

Reserved forests of India
Asiatic Lion Reintroduction Project
Animal reintroduction
Environment of Gujarat
Wildlife conservation in India
Wildlife sanctuaries in Gujarat
Amreli district
Protected areas with year of establishment missing